Gigantotrichoderes is a genus of beetles in the family Cerambycidae, containing the following species:

 Gigantotrichoderes conicicollis Tippmann, 1953
 Gigantotrichoderes flabellicornis (Zajciw, 1965)

References

Torneutini